Dmitri Borisovich Kedrin (February 17, 1907 – September 18, 1945) was a Soviet poet. He died in railway-related accident (had been struck by commuter train). Some charge that this accident was murder.

Biography

A sample of Kedrin's poetry

Works

References

External links

 Dmitri Kedrin poetry at Stihipoeta
 Dmitri Kedrin's Poems 

1907 births
1945 deaths
Soviet poets
Soviet male writers
Railway accident deaths in Russia
Accidental deaths in the Soviet Union